Major General Lionel Charles Dunsterville,  (9 November 1865 – 18 March 1946) was a British Army officer, who led Dunsterforce across present-day Iraq and Iran towards the Caucasus and Baku during the First World War.

Early life
Lionel Charles Dunsterville was born in Lausanne, Switzerland on 9 November 1865, the son of Lieutenant General Lionel D'Arcy Dunsterville (1830–1912) of the Indian Army and his wife, Susan Ellen (1835–1875). He went to school with Rudyard Kipling and George Charles Beresford at The United Services College, a public school later absorbed into Haileybury and Imperial Service College, which prepared British young men for careers in Her Majesty's Army. He served as the inspiration for the character "Stalky" in Kipling's collection of school stories Stalky & Co. He was also uncle to H.D. Harvey-Kelly, the first Royal Flying Corps pilot to land in France during the First World War.

Military career
Dunsterville was commissioned into the British Army as a lieutenant in the Sussex Regiment on 23 August 1884. He later transferred to the Indian Army, was promoted to captain on 23 August 1895, and served on the North-West Frontier and in Waziristan. As a railway staff officer he served in China during the Boxer Rebellion 1900–02, for which he was mentioned in despatches (by Major-General O'Moore Creagh, commander of British forces in China after the end of the main hostilities), and was promoted to major on 23 August 1902.

In the First World War Dunsterville held a posting in India. At the end of 1917 the army appointed Major-General Dunsterville to lead an Allied force (Dunsterforce) of fewer than 1,000 Australian, British, Canadian and New Zealand troops, drawn from the Mesopotamian and Western Fronts, accompanied by armoured cars, from Hamadan in the Zagros Mountains of Persia for some 350 km across Qajar Persia. His mission set out from Baghdad in January 1918, aiming to gather information, to train and command local forces, and to prevent the spread of German propaganda.
On his way to Enzeli on the Persian Caspian coast he also fought Mirza Kuchik Khan and his Jangali forces in Manjil.

Dunsterville was assigned to re-inforce the defence of the key oil-field and port of Baku (in present-day Azerbaijan), held from 26 July 1918 by the anti-Soviet Centro Caspian Dictatorship. Dunsterforce personnel first arrived in Baku on 6 August 1918. However, the British and their allies had to abandon Baku on 14 September 1918 in the face of an onslaught by 14,000 Ottoman troops and Azerbaijani Generals like Ali-Agha Shikhlinski and Gaimmegam Hasan Bey, who took the city the next day. The Allies regained control of Baku within two months as a result of the Ottoman armistice of 30 October 1918.

Promoted to major general in 1918, Dunsterville died in 1946 at Torquay, Devon, England.

Family
Captain Lionel Charles Dunsterville of the Indian Staff Corps married Margaret Emily (known as "Daisie"), daughter of Captain John Walter Keyworth late 48th Regiment, in November 1897 at Bishopsteignton, Devon, England.

Their elder son, Lionel Walter Dunsterville, was born on 9 September 1902 at Tientsin, China; their younger son Galfrid Charles Keyworth was born on 18 February 1905; and their daughter Susannah Margaret on 14 July 1911. Galfrid co-authored books on Venezuelan orchids with L. A. Garay. Susannah's first husband was the Swiss lawyer and diplomat August R. Lindt, the son of a renowned chocolate manufacturer. Her second husband was Colditz escapee Damiaen Joan van Doorninck, whom she met in Switzerland during the Second World War as a Resistance worker.

Sources
 Encyclopaedia of the First World War- Who's Who

References

 
 
 
 Stalky's Reminiscences by Major-General L. C. Dunsterville (London: 1928; re-issued under title Stalky's Adventures in 1941)
 Something of myself by Rudyard Kipling
 Stalky and Co. by Rudyard Kipling
 S. P. Menefee, "Dunsterville, Lionel Charles," in H. C. G. Mathews and Brian Harrison (eds.), Oxford Dictionary of National Biography, vol. 17 (2004): pp. 361–63.

External links
 
 The Adventures of Dunsterforce by L.C. Dunsterville
 The Diaries of General Lionel Dunsterville
 More Yarns by L.C. Dunsterville
 Dunsterforce: A Case Study of Coalition Warfare in the Middle East 1918–1919

1865 births
Royal Sussex Regiment officers
British military personnel of the Boxer Rebellion
British military personnel of the Russian Civil War
1946 deaths
Allied intervention in the Russian Civil War
British Indian Army generals
Indian Army generals of World War I
Companions of the Order of the Bath
Companions of the Order of the Star of India
People educated at United Services College
People from Lausanne